Saida Fikri (born 28 November 1971 in Casablanca) is a Moroccan singer and composer. Her songs are blend between Moroccan folk and Western rock music.

She started singing with her brother Khalid Fikri and achieved notability in Morocco in the early 1990s with engaged songs. She is most remembered for songs such as Salouni al Adab (Ask me about pain). In 1998, she was banned in Morocco from public performance for the political tone of her songs. The ban was only lifted in 2008.

In 1997 she emigrated to the United States and settled there and acquired the American citizenship.

Albums 
 1993 : Nadmana
 1995 : Salouni alâdab
 1998 : Al Hamech
 2001 : Kloub Arrahma
 2004 : Assir Al Madfoune
 2005 : Hanna
 2006 : Essilm

See also 
 Hamid Bouchnak

References

External links 
 

People from Casablanca
Living people
21st-century Moroccan women singers
Moroccan expatriates in the United States
Moroccan women activists
Year of birth missing (living people)
20th-century Moroccan women singers